Red Deer Symphony (RDSO) is a regional professional orchestra based in Red Deer, Alberta, Canada.

History

The RDSO was founded with financial assistance from the local branch of the Royal Canadian Legion, as a community ensemble. It developed over time into a professional orchestra presenting six main series concerts, three chamber music series concerts, and a variety of specials and children’s programs. Among the latter is Choir Kids, an annual program which gives the opportunity to twenty elementary school choirs to perform with members of the orchestra.

The Orchestra has been heard in broadcasts for the CBC; replaced the Calgary Philharmonic Orchestra, which was touring Europe at the time, as the Orchestra for the Alberta Ballet Company in 2000; and has frequently collaborated with Edmonton’s Pro Coro Canada.

The orchestra's chamber music concerts were found not to be financially sustainable, and were discontinued in 2012.

Since 1990, its Music Director has been Canadian conductor Claude Lapalme.

In 2017 the orchestra took part in Canada 150 celebration concert with Steven Page. For  the anniversary, the RDSO, along with the Toronto Symphony Orchestra, had commissioned a short composition by Canadian composer Cheryl Cooney, entitled "Are we not drawn onward, we few, drawn onward to new era?".

The orchestra receives some of its funding through grants from the Red Deer Community Cultural Development Fund.

The RDSO appeared as a headlining act at the 2019 Canada Winter Games in Red Deer, Alberta.

References

External links
  

Canadian orchestras
Musical groups from Alberta
Musical groups established in 1987
Red Deer, Alberta
1987 establishments in Alberta